The Belle Vue Aces are a British speedway club, based in Manchester. The club hold the record of having won the top tier League championship 13 times. They currently compete in the SGB Premiership, racing at The National Speedway Stadium, with home matches usually taking place on Monday evenings. They also run a second team in the National Development League, known as the Belle Vue Colts.

History
Racing first took place in 1928 at the Belle Vue greyhound stadium in Kirkmanshulme Lane before moving the following year to a specially built stadium nearby on Hyde Road. The club raced there until 1987 when the stadium was demolished. The club moved to a new track at its original home and remained there before moving to the National Speedway Stadium in 2016.

Hyde Road Stadium
It is alleged that Britain's first open grass-track event took place here on 25 February 1928. Later, with the grass gone, it was claimed to be the first purpose built speedway track in Britain. The opening speedway meeting here was staged on 23 March 1929, when Arthur Franklyn won the Golden Helmet.

Belle Vue resigned from league racing (English Dirt Track League) in 1929, stating that it wasn't popular enough. In 1930 they were leading members of the uncompleted Northern League. In 1931 Belle Vue reserves took over Harringay's fixtures, after they had withdrawn from the Southern League. This meant the Aces had a team in both the Northern and Southern Leagues although they were often referred to as Manchester in the Southern League.

Belle Vue again had two teams in 1934, one in the National League and the other, known as the Goats, in the reserve league. Liverpool transferred their provincial league operation to Belle Vue in 1937, so again, Belle Vue had a team in both leagues.

Belle Vue was the only track to continue operating throughout the Second World War, running a total of 176 meetings during the war years, which were attended by a total of 2,816,000 people. The winners of the wartime British Individual Championships were:
1940 Eric Chitty
1941 Eric Chitty
1942 Eric Chitty
1943 Ron Clarke
1944 Frank Varey
1945 Bill Kitchen

After the war, team racing resumed, with the Aces taking their place in the 1946 National League, and subsequently Division One the following year. There was sadness on 13 September 1947 however, when manager E.O. Spence died. Johnnie Hoskins took over from Alice Hart as promoter in 1953.

With so few tracks running, the Aces found themselves in the 11 team National League in 1957. A change in promoter occurred in 1960 with Ken Sharples taking charge. Harold Jackson took over as Speedway Manager in 1964, prior to the Aces becoming founder members of the British League in 1965. Dent Oliver became Speedway Manager in 1967, and remained in that position until 1973.

Frank Varey took over as Speedway Manager in 1974, before Jack Fearnley took up the reins in 1974. In 1982, former World Stock-Car Champion Stuart Bamforth became promoter. The stadium was also used for Stock Car racing right up to its closure in 1987.

Following the announcement that Bamforth had sold the stadium for redevelopment, the last speedway meeting was staged on 1 November 1987, when a double header took place. Firstly, Belle Vue defeated the Coventry Bees in a replay of the League Cup before losing to the Cradley Heath Heathens in the final league match ever raced at Hyde Road.

Kirkmanshulme Lane

The greyhound track at Belle Vue Stadium (Kirkmanshulme Lane) was the first to open in Britain when, on 24 July 1926, some 1,700 enthusiasts witnessed a dog called Mistley win the very first race. A grass-track meeting took place here on 5 May 1928, with Syd Jackson emerging as the winner. The dirt track was stated to be similar in size and shape to Wimbledon and Harringay, with the first meeting going ahead on 28 July 1928, when Frank Arthur won the Golden Helmet.

When the stadium at Hyde Road was sold in 1987, the Aces moved back to the Greyhound Stadium, under the promotion of Peter Collins, John Perrin and Don Bowes. The opening meeting of the new era of the Aces was held on 1 April 1988, and saw Belle Vue take on Bradford Dukes in the Frank Varey Northern Trophy. However, the match was abandoned after just two heats due to a waterlogged track (rain), with the Aces leading the match.

Due to other commitments Collins resigned from his promotional position in 1989, leaving Perrin and Bowes in charge of the Aces. With the amalgamation of the two leagues, Belle Vue became members of the British League Division One in 1991.

A further management change in 1994 saw George Carswell link with Perrin and Bowes as co-promoter. Both divisions of the British League joined to form a 21 team Premier League in 1995, with the Aces becoming founder members.

A further promoting change in 1995 saw John Hall replace Don Bowes, to link up with Perrin and Carswell. The Premier League broke in two at the end of 1996, with the Aces becoming members of the new Elite League, where they have remain up until the present day.

A change of promotion occurred in late 2004 as John Perrin sold the club to Workington promoters Tony Mole and Ian Thomas. This was Thomas's second stint in charge of The Aces. A further change in ownership occurred in December 2006 as ex-captain Chris Morton along with David Gordon bought the club from Tony Mole and Ian Thomas.

Belle Vue rode at Kirkmanshulme Lane until the end of the 2015 season before moving to the newly built National Speedway Stadium in 2016.

Throughout its history the team has produced five world Speedway World Champions and two Under-21 World Champions.

National Speedway Stadium
The Aces moved to a new purpose-built stadium in Gorton in 2016, which also serves as the national stadium for British speedway. Following early teething troubles with the track surface which led to meetings being postponed, the Belle Vue team had a successful season and finished the league programme at the top. However, following matches with Lakeside Hammers (won) the Aces lost to Wolverhampton Wolves in the two-leg Play-off finals.

The track has since become widely regarded as the best in the UK. It has hosted the British Final since 2016 and a number of international meetings.

In 2022, the club won their 13th league title after winning the SGB Premiership 2022.

Full season summary

Previous Teams

Notable riders

Individual World Champions
 – 1955, 1962
 – 1967
 – 1969, 1970, 1972
 – 1976
 – 2004, 2006, 2009

Individual Under-21 World Champions
 – 1993
 – 2016

Club honours
League Champions – 1930 1931 1933 1934 1935 1936 1963 1970 1971 1972 1982 1993 2022
Knock Out Cup Winners – 1931 1972 1973 1975 2005 2017
Premiership Trophy – 1983
League Cup Winners – 1983
Inter-League Cup Winners – 1975
National League – 1933 1934 1935 1936 1963
National Trophy – 1933 1934 1935 1936 1937 1946 1947 1949 1958
English Speedway Trophy Winners (Reserves) – 1938
ACU Cup – 1934 1935 1936 1937 1946
British Speedway Cup – 1939 1947
British League Division Two Winners-Colts – 1968 1969
Britannia Shield – 1957 1958 1960
Northern League Champions – 1930 1931
British League Division Two KO Cup Winners-Colts – 1969
Northern KO Cup – 1931
Four Team Championship Winners – 1992
Youth Development League Winners – 2001
Elite League Pairs Winners – 2006 (Simon Stead & Jason Crump)
League Riders Winners – Ivan Mauger 1971 Peter Collins 1974 1975 Chris Morton 1984 Shawn Moran 1989 Joe Screen 1992 Jason Crump 2006 2008 Rory Schlein 2011

References

External links

British speedway teams
Sport in Manchester
1928 establishments in England
Sports clubs established in 1928
History of sport in Manchester